Events from the year 1706 in France

Incumbents
 Monarch – Louis XIV

Events
23 May – Battle of Ramillies
8 September – Battle of Castiglione

Births

Full date missing
Sébastien Bigot de Morogues, soldier (died 1781)

Deaths
  
28 December – Pierre Bayle, philosopher (born 1647)

Full date missing
Ferdinand de Marsin, general (born 1656)
Adrien Baillet, scholar and critic (born 1649)
Jacques Testu de Belval, poet and preacher (born c.1626)
Thomas Regnaudin, sculptor (baptized 1622)
Jean Testu de Mauroy, clergyman and academic (born 1626)
Jacques Boyvin, composer (born c.1649)

See also

References

1700s in France